Law clerks have assisted the justices of the United States Supreme Court in various capacities since the first one was hired by Justice Horace Gray in 1882. Each justice is permitted to have between three and four law clerks per Court term. Most persons serving in this capacity are recent law school graduates (and typically graduated at the top of their class). Among their many functions, clerks do legal research that assists justices in deciding what cases to accept and what questions to ask during oral arguments, prepare memoranda, and draft orders and opinions. After retiring from the Court, a justice may continue to employ a law clerk, who may be assigned to provide additional assistance to an active justice or may assist the retired justice when sitting by designation with a lower court.

Table of law clerks 
The following is a table of law clerks serving the associate justice holding Supreme Court seat 10 (the Court's tenth associate justice seat by order of creation), which was established on April 10, 1869 by the 41st Congress through the Judiciary Act of 1869. This seat is currently occupied by Justice Clarence Thomas.

|}

|}

|}

|}

|}

|}

|}
|}

Notes

References

Additional sources 
 Baier, Paul R. (1973). "The Law Clerks: Profile of an Institution," Vanderbilt L. Rev. 26: 1125–77.
 "Finding Aid to Thurgood Marshall Papers," Library of Congress, list of clerks.
 "Georgia Law Alumni Who Have Clerked for a U.S. Supreme Court Justice," Advocate, Spring/Summer 2004 (listing 6 names).
 Judicial Clerkship Handbook, USC Gould Law School, 2013-2014, p. 33, Appendix B.
 "List of law clerks," The Papers of Justice Tom C. Clark, Tarlton Law Library, University of Texas Law School. Retrieved August 11, 2016.
 Newland, Charles A. (June 1961). "Personal Assistants to the Supreme Court Justices: The Law Clerks," Oregon L. Rev. 40: 306–07.
 News of Supreme Court clerks. University of Virginia Law School, list of clerks, 2004-2018.
 University of Michigan clerks to the Supreme Court, 1991-2017, University of Michigan Law School Web site (2016). Retrieved September 20, 2016.
 Ward, Artemus and David L. Weiden (2006). Sorcerers' Apprentices: 100 Years of Law Clerks at the United States Supreme Court. New York, NY: New York University Press. , .

External links 
 Supreme Court of the United States official website
 SCOTUS Justices: How Do Their Clerks Help Them?, Marcia Coyle of the National Law Journal,  by PBS NewsHour, via youtube

Seat 10
Supreme Court of the United States people